Gopal Chakraborty (born 1 September 1936) is an Indian former cricketer. He played seven first-class matches for Bengal between 1954 and 1964.

See also
 List of Bengal cricketers

References

External links
 

1936 births
Living people
Indian cricketers
Bengal cricketers
Cricketers from Kolkata